Peregrine, Latin Peregrinus, is a name originally meaning "one from abroad", that is, a foreigner, traveller, or pilgrim. It may refer to:

 Peregrine falcon, a bird of prey

People

Peregrine
 Peregrine (martyr) (died 182 AD), Roman Catholic saint
 Peregrine of Auxerre (martyr) (died c. 304 AD), Roman Catholic saint
 Perry Anderson (born 1938), British intellectual and essayist
 Peregrine Bertie (disambiguation), several people
 Peregrine Cavendish, 12th Duke of Devonshire (born 1944), British peer
 Peregrine Cust (disambiguation), several people
 Peregrine Hoby (1602–1679), English Member of Parliament
 Peregrine Honig (born 1976), American artist
 Peregrine Hopson (1696–1759), British army officer
 Peregrine Laziosi (1260–1345), Roman Catholic saint
 Sir Peregrine Maitland (1777–1854), British soldier and colonial administrator
 Peregrine Ó Duibhgeannáin (1600s), Irish historian
 Peregrine Osborne (disambiguation), several people
 Peregrine Pelham (died 1650), English Member of Parliament
 Howell Peregrine (1938–2007), British applied mathematician
 Sir Peregrine Simon (born 1950), British High Court judge
 Peregrine White (1620–1704), first English child born in America after the arrival of the Mayflower
 Sir Peregrine Worsthorne (1923–2020), British journalist

Peregrinus
 Peregrinus, Bishop of Terni (died 138 AD), Roman Catholic saint
 Peregrinus Proteus (died 165 AD), a Cynic philosopher
 Tiberius Pollenius Armenius Peregrinus (3rd century AD), Roman consul
 Peregrino I (514) and Peregrino II (649), Archbishops of Messina
 Cetteus or Peregrinus (died 597), Roman Catholic saint and bishop of Amiternum  
 Peregrinus or Piligrim (died 990)
 Bartolfus Peregrinus (died by 1109) or Bartolf of Nangis
 Guilielmus Peregrinus (died 1146), a German pilgrim
 Petrus Peregrinus de Maricourt (1200s), French scholar

Art, music, and literature
 Passing of Peregrinus, a 2nd-century satire by Lucian
 Peregrine (album), 2006 album by the Appleseed Cast
 Peregrine (band), Australian indie rock band 
 "Peregrine", a song by Donovan on the 1968 album The Hurdy Gurdy Man
 "Peregrines", a 2004 short story by Suzy McKee Charnas
 The Peregrine, a 1967 book by J. A. Baker
 "The Peregrin", a story in The Psychotechnic League series
 Tonus Peregrinus, a British vocal ensemble
 Tonus peregrinus, reciting tone in Gregorian chant

Biology
 Peregrine falcon, a bird of prey
 Peregrinus (planthopper), a genus of planthoppers in the family Delphacidae
 Erigeron peregrinus, a flowering plant of the daisy family
 Nicodamus peregrinus, the red and black spider
 Pinus peregrinus, an extinct species of pine
 Platycorynus peregrinus, a species of beetle
 Pseudocheirus peregrinus, the common ringtail possum

Business
 Peregrine Investments Holdings, a Hong Kong investment company
 Peregrine Financial Group, an American futures brokerage firm
 Peregrine Holdings Limited, a company traded on the Johannesburg Securities Exchange
 Peregrine Semiconductor, an American fabless semiconductor company
 Peregrine Systems, a software company

Characters
 Peregrine Fisher, lead character in the 2019 television series Ms Fisher's Modern Murder Mysteries and niece of Phryne Fisher
 James Peregrine Lester, a character played by Ben Miller in British television series Primeval
 Miss Peregrine, a character in the 2011 novel Miss Peregrine's Home for Peculiar Children by Ransom Riggs
 Peregrine (comics), a Marvel Comics character
 Peregrine (Wild Cards), a character in the Wild Cards comic series
 Peregrine Pickle, the titular protagonist of a 1751 novel by Tobias Smollett
 Peregrin Took, character in the 1950s series The Lord of the Rings by J. R. R. Tolkien
 Peregrine, a character in Volpone a 1600s play by Ben Jonson
 Peregrine family, characters in the 1989 and 1991 novels by Jude Deveraux
 Peregrine Hazard, a character in the 1991 novel Wise Children by Angela Carter
 Sir Walter Peregrine, a character in the 1637 play The Example by James Shirley

Military
 Operation Peregrine, a 2003 Canadian military operation
 USS Peregrine (AM-373), a U.S. Navy ship

Places
 El Peregrino, a settlement in General Pinto Partido, Argentina
 Peregrinus Peak, an Antarctic peak
 Mons Peregrinus or the Citadel of Raymond de Saint-Gilles

Sport
 Peregrine (horse) (1878 – c. 1898), British racehorse, winner of the 2000 Guineas in 1881
 St. Peregrines, a Gaelic athletic club

Transportation
 LNER Class A4 60034 Lord Faringdon, a steam locomotive that was at one point named Peregrine
 , a British ship
 Peregrine (spacecraft), a lunar lander designed by Astrobotic Technology
 Rolls-Royce Peregrine, an aero engine

Other uses
 Pilgrim
 Peregrine (journal), full title: Peregrine: American Immigration in the 21st Century, an online journal on immigration to the United States
 Peregrinus (Roman), a designation for a non-citizen subject of the Roman empire
 The Peregrine Fund, a bird conservation organization
 The Peregrine, 1967 book by J. A. Baker on peregrine falcons 
 An astrology term for a planet with no essential dignity

See also
 Pellegrino (disambiguation)